Ryan O'Neal Hinds (born 17 February 1981) is a West Indian cricketer. He is a left-hand batsman and a slow left-arm orthodox bowler.

Hinds made his debut for Barbados during the 1998 Commonwealth Games, aged just 17. He then captained the West Indian Under-19 side during the 2000 Youth World Cup.

While still a twenty-year-old he set a bowling record for Barbados by taking 15 wickets in a match against the Leeward Islands during the 2001 Busta Cup. His first innings figures of 9 for 68 were also a Barbados record. He went into the record books again in a game against the Leeward Islands in 2005/06 when he scored a century in both innings (168 and 150), becoming the first player for Barbados to do so.

His Test debut came against Pakistan at Sharjah in 2001–02 during which he scored a half-century.

In February 2007 while captain of Barbados Hinds showed dissent to an umpiring decision during a bad tempered regional game against Trinidad and Tobago. He escaped a ban, for actions that WICB director Deryck Murray described as the worst behaviour he'd seen in a regional match, because the match report was submitted too late. This along with other incidences of indiscipline have prompted his removal from the captaincy subsequent to which he announced his unavailability for the regional limited-overs championship. It was revealed that Hinds is "mentally exhausted" and that he has sought treatment.

In 2012 he was accused of raping a 28-year-old woman and was arrested but shortly after released on bail.

References

1981 births
Living people
Barbados cricketers
West Indies One Day International cricketers
West Indies Test cricketers
People from Saint James, Barbados
West Indian cricket captains
Cricketers at the 1998 Commonwealth Games
Commonwealth Games competitors for Barbados
Barbadian cricketers